"Is It Wrong (For Loving You)" is a song written by Warner Mack. Mack recorded the song in 1957, and reached No. 9 on the Billboard country charts and spent 36 weeks on the chart.

Cover Versions
"Is It Wrong (For Loving You)" was recorded by a number of artists:
In 1960, it was  covered by Webb Pierce and peaked at No. 11 on the country charts.
Sonny James recorded a cover version in 1972, shortly after signing with Columbia Records. In the winter of 1974, he released the song as a single, and it eventually became the final of 23 number ones on the country chart.  The single stayed at number one for a single week and spent a total of 11 weeks on the country chart.

Chart performance

Warner Mack

Webb Pierce

Sonny James

References

1958 singles
1960 singles
1974 singles
Warner Mack songs
Webb Pierce songs
Sonny James songs
Songs written by Warner Mack
Columbia Records singles
1957 songs
Song recordings produced by George Richey